Parliamentary elections were held in Portugal on 29 January 1922. The Democratic Party emerged as the largest in Parliament, winning 74 of the 163 seats in the House of Representatives and 37 of the 70 seats in the Senate.

Background
The elections were held less than a year after the July 1921 legislative elections, in which the Republican Liberal Party (PLR) had won a majority of votes. However, on 19 October 1921 ("the night of blood"), a military coup resulted in several republican figures being killed, including PLR prime minister António Granjo. On the night of blood, President António José de Almeida invested Manuel Maria Coelho as Prime Minister, but his government resigned on 3 November. On the same day, Carlos Maia Pinto became Prime Minister, but also resigned on 16 December. Francisco Cunha Leal then served as Prime Minister until the elections. The elections took place amidst instability and violence and were postponed four times before finally taking place on 29 January.

Results

Aftermath 

The Democratic Party failed to win an absolute majority of seats and Afonso Costa chose not to form government. Instead, António Maria da Silva of the Democratic Party became Prime Minister on 6 February, leading a minority government with the support of the Reconstitution Party, the Catholic Centre Party, the Regionalist Party and some independents. However, the government failed to serve a full term after being forced to resign following a motion of no confidence in November 1923. Further instability resulted in seven different governments holding office in the subsequent period until the 1925 elections.

References

External links
Eleições de 1922

Legislative elections in Portugal
Portugal
Legislative
January 1922 events